Father Samuel or Père Samuel (born 1942) is a Syriac Orthodox monk-priest. He was formerly incardinated in the Syriac Catholic Church, but due to his perceived bigotry against Islam, he was considered by his Belgian Roman Catholic bishop to be a suspended priest of Aramean origin. His passport gives his name as Charles-Clément Boniface, but he was born in Bağlarbaşı (Arnas) nearby Midyat, Turkey, as Samuel Ozdemir. The latter is a surname the priest dislikes because it was imposed on his family by the Turks. He was suspended in 2011 from celebrating cult and sacrements by the bishop of Tournai.

Early life in the Church

Samuel comes from a Syriac Orthodox family. In his early years he became a Syriac Orthodox monk in the monastery of Deyrulzafaran. When Samuel fled to Lebanon after a dispute with the archbishop of Deyrulzafaran, Samuel became a Syrian Catholic priest. In the mid-1970s he fled to Belgium, claiming that the Aramaic Christians were being persecuted in Turkey. He became a Belgian and adopted the surname of Boniface – "he who does good things." He was appointed to the diocese of Tournai, but clashed with the bishop. He then bought the St-Antoine-de-Padoue church in Montignies-sur-Sambre. There he conducts the Mass according to the traditional rites of the Catholic Church.

Career
Hundreds of faithful from all over the country and even from the north of France attend Sunday Mass in Montignies-sur-Sambre. The congregation includes African immigrants, a large number of young people and many young families with small children. In his sermons and on his website Father Samuel speaks out against secularism and Islam, claiming that Muslims are invading Europe and that "so-called moderate Muslims do not exist."

In 2012 he participated in the international counter-jihad conference in Brussels.

Controversy

Allegations of incitement to racist hatred
Father Samuel has been prosecuted for "incitement to racist hatred" by the Centre for Equal Opportunities and Opposition to Racism (CEOOR)

In 2006, the Belgian judiciary decided that the priest will have to stand trial before the penal court in Charleroi. He reacted by repeating his "time bomb" statement and added that he would be honoured if he had to go to jail for speaking his mind. He added that Jesus, too, had been convicted. 

Father Samuel was acquitted, of charges of incitement to racial hatred. The Court of First Instance of Charleroi found no punishable acts according to the Belgian anti-discrimination.

Cult status
Former members say he has an anti-social speech which breaks families, he praticize sexual touchings against adult women and he receives many cash donations. Father Samuel is also criticized by evangelical associations fighting against cults, but mainly on doctrinal issues.

Samuel rejected these accusations and sent protest letters to the parliamentary members.

References

External links
  Official site 

1942 births
20th-century Belgian Roman Catholic priests
Living people
Belgian politicians
Converts to Roman Catholicism from Oriental Orthodoxy
Christian critics of Islam
Counter-jihad activists
Belgian people of Assyrian/Syriac descent
Turkish people of Assyrian descent
20th-century Eastern Catholic clergy
20th-century Oriental Orthodox clergy